Jalal Uddin Talukder (died 25 September 2012) was a Bangladesh Awami League politician and a Jatiya Sangsad member representing the Mymensingh-12, Netrokona-2 and Netrokona-1 constituencies.

Career
Talukder was elected to parliament from Mymensingh-12 as a Bangladesh Awami League candidate in 1979. He was elected to parliament from Netrokona-2 as a Bangladesh Awami League candidate in 1986. He was elected to parliament from Netrokona-1 as a Bangladesh Awami League candidate in 12 June 1996.

Death
Talukder was shot dead in his home in Netrokona on 26 September 2012.

Personal life
Talukdar was married to Ayesha Khanam. He had a son, Kutubuddin Talukder Royel.

References

1940s births
2012 deaths
Awami League politicians
2nd Jatiya Sangsad members
3rd Jatiya Sangsad members
7th Jatiya Sangsad members
Deaths by firearm in Bangladesh
Place of birth missing
Year of birth missing